

The All American 10A Ensign was a two-seat light plane built in the United States shortly after World War II.  It was a low-wing, all-metal cantilever monoplane with fixed tricycle undercarriage and which seated its pilot and passenger side by side under an expansive bubble canopy.  Due to the glut of military surplus aircraft on the civil market after the war, All American was unable to attract buyers and no production ensued.

Variants
 10A
 10D - proposed development with retractable undercarriage and 125 hp (93 kW) engine

Specifications (performance estimated)

References

 
 aerofiles.com

See also

Single-engined tractor aircraft
Low-wing aircraft
1940s United States civil utility aircraft
Ensign
Aircraft first flown in 1945